AppLovin Corporation is a mobile technology company headquartered in Palo Alto, California. Founded in 2012, it operated in stealth mode until 2014. AppLovin enables developers of all sizes to market, monetize, analyze and publish their apps through its mobile advertising, marketing, and analytics platforms MAX, AppDiscovery, and SparkLabs. AppLovin operates Lion Studios, which works with game developers to promote and publish their mobile games. AppLovin also has large investments in various mobile game publishers. In 2020, 49% of AppLovin's revenue came from businesses using its software and 51% from consumers making in-app purchases.

History
AppLovin was founded in 2012 by Adam Foroughi, John Krystynak, and Andrew Karam. Foroughi stated that the AppLovin name came from Bloglovin', a content organizing company, contrary to reports of a homage to the Christopher Mintz-Plasse character from the 2007 film  Superbad.

The company operated in stealth mode until 2014, raising $4 million in financing from angel investors, Streamlined Ventures and the Webb Investment Network. Before emerging from stealth mode, AppLovin acquired customers including Opentable and Spotify. In October 2014, AppLovin purchased the German mobile ad-network Moboqo.

On September 26, 2016, it was reported that AppLovin had agreed to be acquired by the Chinese private equity firm, Orient Hontai Capital, for $1.42 billion; the acquisition deal was subsequently abandoned for debt investment after opposition to the plans from CFIUS. The company was ranked #10 on the 2016 Deloitte Fast 500 North America list, and again in 2018. Foroughi was recognized on the 2017 San Francisco Business Times "40 Under 40" list.

In July 2018, AppLovin launched Lion Studios, which works with mobile developers to publish and promote their games. The convertible note facility that AppLovin received from Hontai Capital was fully refinanced in August 2018, after AppLovin raised a significant credit facility from U.S.-based investors. Hontai retain a small equity stake in AppLovin. That same month, the private equity firm KKR & Co. Inc. acquired a minority stake in AppLovin for $400 million. In September 2018, AppLovin acquired the in-app bidding company MAX. It added partnerships with Adjust and Facebook Audience Network to its in-app bidding for developers.

In 2019, the company acquired SafeDK, a software development kit management platform for ad quality, performance and stability in mobile apps. AppLovin also announced it had invested in several mobile game studios including PeopleFun, Firecraft Studios and Belka Games.

In 2020, Pocket Gamer ranked AppLovin on its list of Top 50 Mobile Game Makers. In February 2020, AppLovin invested in the mobile game studios Geewa, Redemption Games, and it acquired Machine Zone (MZ).

In February 2021, AppLovin announced the acquisition of mobile app measurement company Adjust.

In March 2021, AppLovin company filed for an IPO in order to raise $100 million.

On April 15, 2021, AppLovin became a public company, trading under the ticker APP. AppLovin began trading at US$70 per share, with a total valuation of approximately US$24 billion.

On October 6, 2021, AppLovin announced the acquisition of mobile monetization company MoPub from Twitter for $1.1 billion. The sale was finalized on January 3, 2022.

On August 9, 2022, AppLovin made an offer to buy Unity Technologies in exchange for $17.54 billion of stock. The proposal for merger would result in the Unity CEO John Riccitiello becoming the CEO of the combined entity. AppLovin's bid would require Unity to terminate its recent deal to merge with ironSource. Later that month, Unity's board rejected the offer and committed to complete its acquisition of ironSource.

References

External links

Companies based in Palo Alto, California
Marketing companies established in 2012
American companies established in 2012
2021 initial public offerings
Mobile technology companies
Companies listed on the Nasdaq